Ludwig Louis Albert Zehnder (4 May 1854, in Illnau – 24 March 1949, in Oberhofen am Thunersee) was a  Swiss physicist, one of the inventors of the Mach–Zehnder interferometer.

Zehnder was a student of Wilhelm Röntgen, professor of physics at the universities of Freiburg and Basel. He produced the first pictures of the human skeleton by shining x-rays through the human body.

1854 births
1949 deaths
Swiss physicists
Optical physicists
Illnau-Effretikon
People from Pfäffikon District